Ilias Stogiannis (born 13 February 1976 in Kozani, Greece) is a professional football goalkeeper who last played for Rodos F.C. in the Greek second division.

Stogiannis played for Ionikos F.C. during the 2001–02 Greek Superleague season.

References 

1976 births
Living people
Greek footballers
Greek expatriate footballers
Iraklis Thessaloniki F.C. players
Panetolikos F.C. players
AC Omonia players
Doxa Katokopias FC players
APEP FC players
Ionikos F.C. players
Thrasyvoulos F.C. players
Acharnaikos F.C. players
Olympiacos Volos F.C. players
Expatriate footballers in Cyprus
Cypriot First Division players
Cypriot Second Division players
Association football goalkeepers
Footballers from Kozani